2015 J.League Cup Final was the 23rd final of the J.League Cup competition. The final was played at Saitama Stadium 2002 in Saitama on October 31, 2015. Kashima Antlers won the championship.

Match details

See also
2015 J.League Cup

References

J.League Cup
2015 in Japanese football
Kashima Antlers matches
Gamba Osaka matches